The 1977 United States House of Representatives special election in Minnesota's 7th congressional district was held on February 22, 1977 to select the successor to Bob Bergland (DFL) who resigned to accept appointment as Secretary of Agriculture under the Carter Administration. Independent-Republican candidate Arlan Stangeland defeated the DFL favorite, Mike Sullivan, in an upset landslide.

Race description
On January 22, 1977, Bob Bergland, who had served as the United States representative from Minnesota's 7th congressional district since 1971, resigned in order to accept appointment by President Jimmy Carter as Secretary of Agriculture. All indications prior to the special election seemed to favor the odds that the DFL would hold the district. Bergland won the district in successive landslide victories since its reapportionment following the 1970 census, winning nearly sixty percent of the vote in 1972, over 75 percent in 1974, and 72.34 percent in 1976.

The DFL and the Independent-Republican Party each held special primary elections on February 8. Mike Sullivan, a former staffer for Representative Bergland and former-U.S. Senator/then-Vice President Walter Mondale, defeated former-U.S. Representative Coya Knutson and two other candidates for the DFL nomination. Arlan Stangeland, a farmer who was a delegate to the Republican State conventions from 1964 to 1968, and served as a member of the Minnesota House of Representatives from 1966 to 1975, easily won the Independent-Republican nomination over Dick Franson, a perennial candidate who had run in various Republican primaries in Minnesota.

During the special election campaign, Stangeland campaigned "on the theme that the heavily rural northwestern Minnesota needed another farmer, like Mr. Bergland, in Congress," and likely benefited from "his lifelong residence in the district, his roots as a farmer in a mostly rural area, and his identification as a Lutheran in an area that is predominantly Protestant."

Sullivan, on the other hand, had relied on the support of establishment Democrats rather than making a grassroots outreach to the voters of the district, and was likely "handicapped by his Roman Catholic faith." Sullivan's religious affiliation particularly became a matter of controversy after bishop Victor Hermann Balke encouraged voters in the Diocese of Crookston to vote for Sullivan, whom he described as "very pro-church," and against Stangeland, whom he described as having a "very negative" voting record in the state house.

In the end, Stangeland won the election with a landslide 71,251 votes to Sullivan's 43,467, taking the DFL and most outside observers, who expected that Bergland's broad support from three months earlier would translate into an easy victory for Sullivan, by surprise.

Democratic–Farmer–Labor primary

Candidates

Declared
 F. E. "Fritz" Anderson
 Bill Kjeldahl
 Coya Gjesdal Knutson, former United States Representative from Minnesota's 9th congressional district (1955–1959); first woman elected to Congress from Minnesota
 Mike Sullivan, former staffer for Representative Bob Bergland and Senator Walter Mondale

Results

Independent-Republican primary

Candidates

Declared
 Richard "Dick" Franson, perennial candidate in various Republican primary elections throughout Minnesota
 Arlan Stangeland, former member of the Minnesota House of Representatives (1966–1975)

Results

Special election

Results

See also
 List of special elections to the United States House of Representatives

References 

Minnesota 1977 07
Minnesota 1977 07
1977 07 Special
Minnesota 07 Special
United States House of Representatives 07 Special
United States House of Representatives 1977 07